Brian Stuart Johnston (born 13 November 1958 in Dunedoo, New South Wales) is an Australian former rugby league footballer and administrator. He played with the St George Dragons and represented for the Australian national rugby league team on one occasion.

Career
An athletic speedster who played Colts for Eastern Suburbs RUFC while studying at the Institute of Technology in Sydney, Johnston signed with St George in 1980 and played for New South Wales in the State of Origin series on eight occasions between 1984–1989. He represented in the centres or at wing for the Blues in all three games of the 1987 State of Origin series plus the 4th 'exhibition' game played in Los Angeles. He was also selected for one game in the 1984, 1985 and 1986 Origin series. After missing the 1988 series, Johnston was recalled for Game 3 of the 1989 State of Origin series in what would be his final representative appearance.

Injury caused Johnston to miss a place in St. George's 1985 Grand Final side which went down 6–7 to the Canterbury-Bankstown Bulldogs and he was considered unlucky not to tour with the 1986 Kangaroos.
 
Brian Johnston played in his only test for Australia in 1987, coming off the reserves bench in Australia's shock 6–13 loss to New Zealand at Lang Park in Brisbane.

Johnston assumed the St George captaincy in 1989 but retired at the beginning of the 1990 season because of injury.

He was awarded Life Membership of the St. George Dragons club in 1990.

Administrative career

After football, he became St George's chief executive officer in 1996. He was named Australian Test manager for the 1999 ANZAC Test. Johnston drew criticism of his handling of the sacking of Craig Gower for misbehaviour in the week before the Test. He resigned in 1999 because of ill health.

References

Sources
Encyclopedia of Rugby League Players, St George/Illawarra edition, Alan Whiticker & Glen Hudson

Australian rugby league players
St. George Dragons players
New South Wales Rugby League State of Origin players
Australia national rugby league team players
Country New South Wales rugby league team players
Country New South Wales Origin rugby league team players
Australian chief executives
Australian rugby league administrators
1958 births
Living people
Rugby league centres
Rugby league wingers